Sean Everitt is a South African professional rugby union football coach. He was named as head coach of the Sharks team that plays in the Super Rugby competition. He is also the coach of the Sharks (Currie Cup) team that competes in the Currie Cup.He stepped down from his role as Head Coach after the Sharks suffered a huge defeat 35-0.

References

Living people
South African rugby union coaches
Sharks (rugby union) coaches
Year of birth missing (living people)